The Norman Aviation J6 Karatoo is a Canadian advanced ultralight aircraft, that was designed by Jesse Anglin, and produced by Norman Aviation of Saint-Anselme, Quebec. The aircraft was supplied as a kit for amateur construction, or as a complete ready-to-fly-aircraft.

Production is complete, and the J6 Karatoo is no longer available from Norman Aviation.

Design and development
The Norman Aviation J6 Karatoo was a modified version of the original Anglin J6 Karatoo, designed to comply with the Canadian ultralight rules. It features a strut-braced high-wing, a two-seats-in-side-by-side configuration enclosed cockpit with doors, fixed conventional landing gear and a single engine in tractor configuration.

The aircraft fuselage is made from welded steel tubing, with its wings made from wood, and all surfaces covered in doped aircraft fabric. The wing is supported by V-struts and jury struts. The standard engines used are the  Rotax 582 two-stroke, the  Rotax 912UL or  Subaru EA four-stroke powerplants.

Construction time from the factory supplied kit is estimated at 300 hours.

Operational history
In February 2018 there were 12 Norman J6 Karatoos on the Transport Canada Civil Aviation Register.

Specifications (J6 Karatoo)

References

External links

1980s Canadian ultralight aircraft
Homebuilt aircraft
Single-engined tractor aircraft